"Wake Up" is a song by American deathcore band Suicide Silence. It was released as the first single from their second album, No Time to Bleed through Century Media Records, on December 29, 2009 as an iTunes digital release and vinyl run limited to 1,000 copies.

Music video
The music video to the song "Wake Up" appears to be focused on a young woman experiencing an extreme LSD trip, and is contradicted by the lines " Wake Up/ wake Up/ this is no hallucination". The video consists of psychedelic displays and atmosphere whilst the band is performing and the woman's trip continues as frontman Mitch Lucker tries to focus her out of it. As the video progresses and the guitar solo starts, the guitar seems to change into some kind of tentacle. The woman finally opens her eyes by the video's end.

The music video was directed by David Brodski.

Track listing

Personnel
Suicide Silence
 Mitch Lucker – vocals
 Mark Heylmun – lead guitar
 Chris Garza – rhythm guitar
 Dan Kenny – bass
 Alex Lopez – drums
Production
Produced by Shawn Crahan, who is also the mixer of the track "Wake Up (Clown of Slipknot Remix)"

References

2009 songs
Century Media Records singles
Suicide Silence songs